James Lowe (born 27 January 1956) is an Australian rower. He competed at the 1980 Summer Olympics and the 1984 Summer Olympics.

References

External links
 

1956 births
Living people
Australian male rowers
Olympic rowers of Australia
Rowers at the 1980 Summer Olympics
Rowers at the 1984 Summer Olympics
Place of birth missing (living people)
20th-century Australian people